St. Gabriel Academy, Caloocan, also referred to as SGA or SGA Caloocan, is a Catholic Diocesan school in Caloocan, under the Diocese of Kalookan. It was established in 1968. Jaime Cardinal Sin commissioned the Sisters of St. Paul of Chartres to administer the school from 1968 until 2016 when the SPC Sisters handed on to the Diocese of Kalookan. Its full administration under the tutelage of Pablo Virgilio S. David, D.D. as the second Bishop of Diocese of Kalookan.

History

St. Gabriel Academy is a parochial school under the Diocese of Kalookan founded by Msgr. Pacifico Mendoza, who saw the need to educate the children in his parish.

In 1968-69 the school began its operation under the headship of Sr. Marie Lorraine, M.M. then the principal of St. James Academy, Malabon. It was agreed upon that all graduates of the St. Gabriel Academy would continue their secondary education at the St. James Academy.

With the transfer of Msgr. Pacifico Mendoza, Fr. Alfredo Santos took over the directorship until 1979. He was followed by Rev. Fr. Norberto Habos in which events turned out significantly when Jaime Cardinal Sin commissioned the Sisters of St. Paul of Chartres to administer the school.

This call to mission was immediately responded to by the SPC Sisters through Mother Marie dela Croix, SPC, appointing Sr. Fideliza Portillo, SPC as the first principal in the year 1979–1980. She was replaced by Sr. Mary Glyceria Navarro, SPC who served the school in the year 1980–1981. The turn of administration gained a succession until eventually the first SPC community was established in the year 1981–1982. Sr. Jacinta de Marie Quindo, SPC was the Sister Superior and at the same time the principal for nine years from 1981 to 1990 inclusive.

In 1985-1989 classrooms were built for the Elementary Department, and the school clinic and dental facilities were remodelled. An increase in student population was observed for in 1987-1988 rises to 7%, 1988-1989 13.5%, and 1989-1990 8%. Grades V and VI had the morning and afternoon sessions to accommodate transfers. Double single session classes were implemented at all levels due to a great increase in population.

In 1990-1992 was the peak of the student population in the Grade School Department with a total of 2,999 enrollees. Sr. Blandine Jamias, SPC became the principal with Sr. Milagros Ycasas, SPC, as the Local Superior. The following school year, Sr. Edna Lopez, SPC, was appointed as principal until 1995.

In 1996-1997 repainting of the classrooms in the old building, Guidance Center, and Faculty Room were relocated. MAPSA visitation for evaluation was "Favorable". Purchase of lot for the High School Department due to parents' demand.

In 1998–1999, Employees Salary scheme was based on a merit system. Kindergarten 1 started using the new Gabrielan uniform with the intention of gradual implementation until all students/pupils are using the said uniform. SGA launched its very first publication the "Gabrielan" and the realization of the launching of the Yearbook. There was a stage presentation entitled "The Wizard of Oz". In this year was the completion of requirements for the application of the High School Department and opened with 104 students.

SGA managed to address the challenges of the new millennium that 1999-2000 was made significantly with the opening of the High School Department. It was during the time of Fr. Nestor Gungon and Sr. Mary Angelina Rojas, SPC, when the high school department began its operation. While Sr. Angelina was the grade school principal, Fr. Nestie on the other hand was both the school director and H.S. principal. In the second year of operation of the high school, Fr. Nestie was succeeded by Msgr. Wilfredo Paguio.

During S.Y. 2001–2002, Sr. Mary Glyceria Navarro, SPC became the principal for both the grade school and high school departments. It was during the incumbency of Sr. Glyceria where SGA acquired facilities. These include the function hall, Bio-Chem, Physics, T.H.E., and Speech Laboratory. Msgr. Paguio, after a two-year term was succeeded by Rev. Fr. Alex V. Amandy who assumed office as a school director, effective April 1, 2002. Fr. Alex effected renovations of the physical plant, which lead to the completion of the high school building into five-story edifice with its gymnasium on the 5th floor.

In 2003 St. Gabriel Academy automatically became a member of the Kalookan Diocese Schools Association (KADSA) but still a part of the Manila Archdiocesan and Parochial Schools Association (MAPSA).

In 2005 SGA achieved the Education Service Contracting (ESC) Certification and the Gabrielan ESC grantees are assured of financial assistance throughout junior high school. SGA is an ESC/FAPE Certified School.

During 2016–2017, the Sisters of the St. Paul of Chartres handed on St. Gabriel Academy to the Diocese of Kalookan. Its full administration under the tutelage of the Pablo Virgilio S. David, D.D. as the second Bishop of Diocese of Kalookan.

Rev. Fr. Kennedy A. Neral, Ph.D. was appointed by the bishop to continue the academic work in SGA, as the director and principal and concurrently the KADSA (Kalookan Diocese Schools Association) Superintendent and Parochial Vicar of St. Gabriel the Archangel Parish.

Neral applied for Senior High School to accommodate the Gabrielans to finish their basic education.

In pursuant of the Republic Act No. 10533, otherwise known as the "Enhanced Basic Education Act of 2013", the SGA Senior High School was opened in 2017–2018.

Full renovation and repainting of grade school, Junior High, and Senior High school buildings. Restoration of the laboratories (new speech laboratory, science, computer, and T.L.E. laboratories).

2018-2019 marked the Golden Jubilee Year of St. Gabriel Academy.

References

External links 
 

Catholic elementary schools in Metro Manila
Catholic secondary schools in Metro Manila
Schools in Caloocan
Educational institutions established in 1968
1968 establishments in the Philippines